The Betsileo mabuya (Trachylepis betsileana) is a species of skink possibly found in Madagascar. This species hasn't been recorded from Madagascar for about 100 years. It is probably a mislabelled specimen from Africa, not Madagascar. It is only known from the type specimen.

References

Trachylepis
Reptiles described in 1906
Taxa named by François Mocquard